The Marina Bay Cruise Centre Singapore (also known as the International Cruise Terminal and abbreviated as MBCCS) is a cruise terminal in Singapore, located at Marina South. The construction of the S$500 million terminal began in October 2009 and was completed on 22 May 2012. It received its first ship, the Voyager of the Seas, on 26 May 2012. The official opening ceremony of MBCCS was on 22 October that year.

The terminal is operated by SATS-Creuers Cruise Services. The addition of MBCCS and the Singapore Cruise Centre at HarbourFront are expected to grow the leisure cruise sector in Singapore.

History
The impetus for construction came from difficulties many cruise operators had with the current Singapore Cruise Centre which is in a narrow channel with a dead end. The geographical limitations of the site impose height and berth limits on the cruise operators. The new location at Marina South has deep waters, a large turning basin, and no height restrictions, which enables it to accommodate the largest cruise ships being built now.

On 18 March 2009, the Ministry of Trade and Industry (MTI) and Singapore Tourism Board (STB) revealed the cruise terminal's design.

On 29 July 2011, SATS submitted a bid to manage and operate the MBCCS, in partnership with European cruise terminal operator Creuers Del Port de Barcelona SA. Singapore Cruise Centre also participated in the tender but it was won by SATS in the end.

A S$7 million upgrade was completed in 2014. A fourth passenger bridge was built to expedite boarding and disembarking. The taxi pick-up area was also redesigned to allow simultaneous boarding.

In 2017, amidst growing demand in the cruise tourism industry, 20 more check-in counters were added, making a total of 120 check-in counters available.

Pier and terminal design

Transport connections

Rail
The nearest MRT station is Marina South Pier MRT station, located about 500m from MBCCS. The upcoming Marina South MRT station is due to open in the future. Both stations will serve the cruise centre and its vicinity.

Bus
There is a bus stop in the MBCCS that caters to bus service 400.

References

Piers in Singapore
Ports and harbours of Singapore
Straits View
Marina Bay, Singapore
2012 establishments in Singapore
Transport in Singapore